Snøfrid Skaare (born 26 September 1939) is a Norwegian politician for the Conservative Party.

She served as a deputy representative to the Norwegian Parliament from Oppland during the term 1993–1997.

On the local level, Skaare has been a member of Nord-Fron municipal council. She lives in Vinstra.

References

1939 births
Living people
Deputy members of the Storting
Conservative Party (Norway) politicians
Oppland politicians
Women members of the Storting
People from Nord-Fron